The King's Cup Sepaktakraw World Championship is a sepak takraw team event which is considered to be the most prestigious tournament in the sport as most top national teams compete in this annual event. The King's Cup is dedicated to His Majesty the King of Thailand. Three regus form a team and winning point is achieved once a team has the majority of two regu victories out of the three regus.

History

In 1985, the first King's Cup tournament was held in Bangkok Thailand where Malaysia emerged as the inaugural champions. Malaysia became champions again in 1988, and the rest of the other editions saw Thailand as champions. The King's Cup tournament is seen by some, especially the Malaysians, as being unfair because it is never held outside of Thailand; hence, critics believe that the host nation is given an obvious upper hand and that the Asian Games are a fairer ground of competition.

25th King's Cup Sepaktakraw World Championship was held in the 700th Anniversary Stadium from July 27 to August 1, 2010 with 23 competition teams. And 26th King's Cup Sepaktakraw World Championship was held in Fasionisland on 12–17 September 2011 with 23 competition teams in 8 tournaments.

Championships
In 1965, the Asian Sepaktakraw Federation (ASTAF) was formed to govern the sport in Asia, then in 1992 the International Sepaktakraw Federation (ISTAF) was formed as the world governing body for the sport.

Kings Cup Sepak Takraw Championship is dedicated to the King of Thailand.

It is a team game where a team is formed by three regus.

The team that has won two points out of three is the winner.

For men’s the championship was started in 1992 and for women in 2005.

In both men and women categories Thailand has mostly won the championship.

Sepaktakraw.org/index.php/istaf/

Www.tutorialspoint.com/sepak_takraw/sepak_takraw_championships.htm

2019 King's Cup Sepaktakraw World Championship

2020 King's Cup Sepaktakraw World Championship - Cancelled

2021 King's Cup Sepaktakraw World Championship - Cancelled

2022 King's Cup Sepaktakraw World Championship

2023 King's Cup Sepaktakraw World Championship

Championships results

Total Medal Table (2010 - 2015 / 6 Edition)

See also 
International Sepaktakraw Federation
ISTAF SuperSeries
Sepak takraw at the Asian Games

References 

Sepak takraw competitions
Sports competitions in Thailand

Recurring sporting events established in 1985
1985 establishments in Thailand